Greendale is the 25th studio album by Neil Young. Young and Crazy Horse's Greendale, a 10-song rock opera, is set in a fictional California seaside town. Based on the saga of the Green family, the musical "audio novel" has been compared to the literary classics of Thornton Wilder's Our Town and Sherwood Anderson's Winesburg, Ohio for its complexity and emotional depth in exploring a small town in America.

Themes

Greendale combines numerous themes on corruption, observation of the passing of time, environmentalism and mass media consolidation. The album, concert, film and DVDs have produced a vast divergence of critical opinion ranging from being called "amateur" to being voted as one of the best albums of 2003 by Rolling Stone magazine music critics.

Releases

The CD was originally released with a DVD of live "Neil-only" acoustic performance of the Greendale material from Vicar Street, Dublin, Ireland. The performance has since been made available as a stand-alone live album on digital download and streaming services such as iTunes and Amazon.

In 2004, the CD was released with a new DVD containing Inside Greendale, a documentary featuring in-studio performances of the album being recorded. A DVD-Audio version and box set vinyl LP version were also released, with both Advanced Resolution Stereo and 5.1 Surround sound mixes, and a video of "Devil's Sidewalk" from the film. In late 2004, the feature-length DVD with actors lip-synching the material was released.

Greendale was the last Neil Young album to feature Crazy Horse until 2012's Americana, and his ninth with that band.

In November 2020, a live album of the songs from Greendale was released as Return to Greendale.

Track listing
All songs written by Neil Young.

Personnel
Neil Young - guitar, organ, harmonica, vocal
Crazy Horse
Ralph Molina - drums, vocal
Billy Talbot - bass, vocal
with:
The Mountainettes:
Pegi Young - vocal
Nancy Hall - vocal
Twink Brewer - vocal
Sue Hall - vocal
Producer- Neil Young
Engineer- John Hausmann
2nd engineer- Will Mitchell
Audio effects- Will Mitchell   
In house music production - Mark Humphreys
Recorded at Plywood Analog
Mixed & Mastered at Redwood Digital 
Mixed by Neil Young, assisted by John Hausmann and Will Mitchell
Mastered by Tim Mulligan

Comics adaptation

Vertigo Comics made the production of the comic book adaptation of the album with the same title. Writer Joshua Dysart and Neil Young were involved in the project. Greendale graphic novel was released in June 2010, with Cliff Chiang providing the art.

Charts

References

External links
 Website with the music, the lyrics, and some images of Neil Young's Greendale (broken link)
Neil Young's Greendale - Reviews of album/CD, film and DVD
IMDb - Greendale (2003)
DC/Vertigo Comics - Neil Young's Greendale 

2003 albums
Albums produced by Larry Johnson (film producer)
Albums produced by Neil Young
Crazy Horse (band) albums
Neil Young albums
Rock operas
Vertigo Comics graphic novels
Warner Records albums